A Father's Will is a 2016 Kyrgyz drama film directed by Bakyt Mukul and Dastan Zhapar Uulu. The film was selected as the Kyrgyz entry for the Best Foreign Language Film at the 89th Academy Awards but it was not nominated.

See also
 List of submissions to the 89th Academy Awards for Best Foreign Language Film
 List of Kyrgyz submissions for the Academy Award for Best Foreign Language Film

References

External links
 

2016 films
2016 drama films
Kyrgyzstani drama films
Kyrgyz-language films